The Movement for Unity, Peace and Security (MUPS) was a political party in the Central African Republic.

History
The party joined the National Convergence "Kwa Na Kwa" alliance for the 2005 general elections. The alliance won 42 seats, of which MUPS won one.

Several Kwa Na Kwa factions merged into a single political party in August 2009.

References

Defunct political parties in the Central African Republic
Political parties with year of disestablishment missing
Political parties with year of establishment missing